Disneyland Park, originally Euro Disneyland Park, is a theme park found at Disneyland Paris in Marne-la-Vallée, France. The park opened on 12 April 1992 as the first of the two parks built at the resort. Designed and built by Walt Disney Imagineering, its layout is similar to Disneyland Park in California and Magic Kingdom Park at Walt Disney World in Florida. Spanning —the second largest Disney park based on the original, after Shanghai Disneyland Park—it is dedicated to fairy tales and Disney characters.

In 2016, the park hosted approximately 8.4 million visitors, making it the most-visited theme park in Europe and the 13th-most visited theme park in the world. The park is represented by Le Château de la Belle au Bois Dormant (Sleeping Beauty Castle), a replica of the fairy tale castle seen in Disney's 1959 animated film Sleeping Beauty.

History 
In order to make things more distinct and not be a mere copy of the original, modifications were made to the park's concepts and designs. Among the changes was the change of Tomorrowland to Discoveryland, giving the area a retrofuturistic theme. Other altered elements include the Haunted Mansion, which was redesigned as Phantom Manor and a retro, more intense version of Space Mountain (now Hyperspace Mountain). The park's location brought forth its own challenges. Sleeping Beauty Castle (Le Château de la Belle au Bois Dormant) is said by its designers to have been necessarily reevaluated for a continent on which authentic castles stand. Modifications to the park were made to protect against changes in weather in the Parisian climate. Covered walkways referred to as "arcades" were added, and Michael Eisner ordered the installation of 35 fireplaces in hotels and restaurants.

The park, as well as its surrounding complex, initially failed to meet financial expectations, resulting in an image change in which the word "Euro" was phased out of several names, including Euro Disney. The park was known as Euro Disney until May 1994, Euro Disneyland Paris until September 1994, Disneyland Paris until February 2002, and Disneyland Park (English) and Parc Disneyland (French) since March 2002.

Michael Eisner noted, "As Americans, the word 'Euro' is believed to mean glamorous or exciting. For Europeans it turned out to be a term they associated with business, currency, and commerce. Renaming the park 'Disneyland Paris' was a way of identifying it with one of the most romantic and exciting cities in the world."

On 14 March 2020 Disneyland Park, alongside the Walt Disney Studios Park, was temporarily closed due to the ongoing COVID-19 pandemic. Both parks remained closed for four months, resuming operations on 15 July with strict rules such as limited guest attendance, social distancing, and mandatory wearing of face masks. The park closed again on 29 October 2020 following a second nationwide lockdown. The park reopened in 17 June 2021.

Park layout and attractions 

Disneyland Park is divided into five themed "lands", which house 49 attractions. The  narrow gauge Disneyland Railroad runs along the perimeter of the park and stops in Main Street, U.S.A., Frontierland, Fantasyland and Discoveryland.

Main Street, U.S.A. 

 Liberty Arcade (covered walkway)
 Discovery Arcade (covered walkway)
 Horse Drawn Streetcars ( narrow gauge tramway)
 Main Street Vehicles
Disneyland Railroad - Main Street Station

Frontierland 

 Legends of the Wild West
 Big Thunder Mountain
 Phantom Manor
 Thunder Mesa Riverboat Landing
 Rustler Roundup Shootin' Gallery
 Frontierland Playground
 Disneyland Railroad – Frontierland Depot

Adventureland 

 Aladdin's Enchanted Passage
 Adventure Isle
 Swiss Family Treehouse
 Pirates Beach
 Pirates of the Caribbean
 Pirate Galleon
 Indiana Jones and the Temple of Peril

Fantasyland 

 Sleeping Beauty Castle
 The Dragon's Lair
Lancelot's Carousel
 Snow White and the Seven Dwarfs
 Pinocchio's Daring Journey
 Dumbo the Flying Elephant
 Peter Pan's Flight
 Alice's Curious Labyrinth
 Mad Hatter's Tea Cups
 It's a Small World
Storybook Land Canal Boats
 Casey Jr. Circus Train
 Meet Mickey Mouse
 Princess Pavilion
 Disneyland Paris Railroad – Fantasyland Station

Discoveryland 

 Buzz Lightyear Laser Blast
 Orbitron
 Autopia
 The Mysteries of the Nautilus
 Hyperspace Mountain  
 Star Tours: The Adventures Continue
Mickey's PhilharMagic
 Disneyland Railroad – Discoveryland Station

Attendance 
 2008 – 12,688,000
 2009 – 12,740,000
 2010 – 10,500,000
 2011 – 10,990,000
 2012 – 11,500,000
 2013 – 10,430,000
 2014 – 9,940,000
 2015 – 10,360,000
 2016 – 8,400,000
 2017 – 9,660,000
2018 – 9,843,000
2019 – 9,745,000
2020 – 2,620,000

Top 3 amusement parks in Europe of annual attendance
 Efteling
 Disneyland Paris
 Europa-Park

Shows and parades 
Disneyland Park hosts a range of daytime and nighttime entertainment throughout the year.

Current

Daytime Shows 
 Disney Stars on Parade: 2017–present

Nighttime Shows

 Disney Illuminations: 2017–present, until 11 April
Mickey's Goodnight Kiss (2017–2018, 2021-present)

Seasonal Events and Shows 
The Lion King and Jungle Festival: 2019–present
 Rhythms of the Pride Lands: 2019–present
Christmas Season
Mickey's Dazzling Christmas Parade: 2021–present
Disney Dreams! of Christmas: 2013–2017, 2022–present
Halloween Season
 Mickey's Halloween Celebration: 2013–2016, 2018–present
 Disney's New Year's Eve Parade: 2017–present
 Sparkling New Year's Eve Fireworks: 1992–present

Retired

Daytime Shows 
 Jedi Training Academy (2015–2017)
 Chantons La Reine des Neiges - Frozen Sing-Along (2015-2018)
 Tarzan: The Encounter (2000-2008, 2011-2012)
 Winnie the Pooh and Friends, too (1998-2005, 2006-2011)
 Mulan, la Légende (1999-2002)
 Beauty and the Beast (1992-1996)

Nighttime Shows 
 Disney Dreams! (2012–2017)
 The Enchanted Fireworks (2008–2012)
 Wishes (2005–2007)
 Fantasy in the Sky (1992–2005)

Train Parades 
 Disney's 20th Anniversary Celebration Train (2012–2013)
 Disney Dance Express (2011–2012)
 Disney All Stars Express (2010–2011)
 Minnie's Party Train (2009–2010)
 Disney Characters Express (2007–2009)

Parades 
 Disney Magic on Parade (2012–2017)
 Disney's Fantillusion (2003–2012)
 Disney's Once Upon a Dream Parade (2007–2012)
 Main Street Electrical Parade (1992–2003)
 Disney ImagiNations Parade (1999–2001)
 The Wonderful World of Disney Parade (1998–1999 and 2001–2007)
 The Hunchback of Notre Dame Carnival (1997–1998)
 Disney Classics Parade (1992–1997)

Shows 
 Jungle Book Jive (2019–2020)
 Halloween Season
 Are You Brave Enough? (2019)
 Christmas Season
 Royal Sparkling Christmas Waltz (2019–2020)
 Mickey's Magical Christmas Lights (2015–2020)
 Disney's Christmas Parade (2012–2019)
 Anniversary Celebrations
 25th Anniversary (2017)
 The Starlit Princess Waltz (2017–2018)
 Mickey Presents Happy Anniversary Disneyland Paris (2017–2018)

See also 

 Rail transport in Walt Disney Parks and Resorts

References

External links 

 

 
Paris
1992 establishments in France
Amusement parks in France
Buildings and structures in Paris
Amusement parks opened in 1992